The Grammy Award for Best Female Pop Vocal Performance was a Grammy Award recognizing superior vocal performance by a female in the pop category, the first of which was presented in 1959. It was discontinued after the 2011 Grammy season. The award went to the artist. Singles or tracks only are eligible.

The award has had quite a convoluted history:
From 1959 to 1960 there was an award called Best Vocal Performance, Female, which was for work in the pop field
In 1961 the award was separated into Best Vocal Performance Single Record Or Track and Best Vocal Performance Album, Female
From 1962 to 1963 the awards from the previous year were combined into Best Solo Vocal Performance, Female
From 1964 to 1968 the award was called Best Vocal Performance, Female
In 1969, the awards were combined and streamlined as the award for Best Contemporary-Pop Vocal Performance, Female
From 1970 to 1971 the award was known as Best Contemporary Vocal Performance, Female
From 1972 to 1994 the award was known as Best Pop Vocal Performance, Female
From 1995 to 2011 it was known as Best Female Pop Vocal Performance

The award was discontinued in 2012 in a major overhaul of Grammy categories. From 2012, all solo performances in the pop category (male, female, and instrumental) were shifted to the newly formed Best Pop Solo Performance category.

Years reflect the year in which the Grammy Awards were presented, for works released in the previous year.

Recipients

Category facts

Most Wins in Category

Most Nominations

 Other facts
 Ella Fitzgerald and Barbra Streisand received the most consecutive wins in this category with 3 (1959-1961 & 1964-1966), respectively.
 Mariah Carey received the most consecutive nominations in this category with 6 (1991-1996), winning once for "Vision of Love".
 Beyoncé is the only artist in this category to be nominated for performing different versions of the same song, for studio version and live version of "Halo", winning for the studio version of this song in 2010.
 Ella Fitzgerald's "Mack The Knife" and Sarah McLachlan's "I Will Remember You" are the only two performances of live songs to win in this category.

Contemporary (R&R) Performance
In 1966 the Recording Academy established a similar, but different, category in the Pop Field for Best Contemporary (rock & roll) Performances. The category went through a number of changes before being discontinued after the 1968 awards.
In 1966 the award was called Best Contemporary (R&R) Vocal Performance - Female
In 1967 the award from the previous year was combined with the equivalent award for men as the Grammy Award for Best Contemporary (R&R) Solo Vocal Performance - Male or Female
In 1968 the previous award was once again separated by gender, with the female award called Best Contemporary Female Solo Vocal Performance

See also
 List of music awards honoring women

References

External links
 Official Site of the Grammy Awards

 
Awards established in 1959
Awards disestablished in 2011
Female Pop Vocal Performance
Female Vocal Performance
Music awards honoring women